The School House is an early American television program broadcast on Tuesday evenings at 9:00 PM Eastern by the DuMont Television Network for a few months in 1949.

Premise
The series was a Vaudeville-inspired variety show/comedy in a school setting, starring Kenny Delmar as the teacher (an earlier version, School Days, had Happy Felton in the role), with such notable actors as Arnold Stang, Wally Cox, and Buddy Hackett playing the students.

Episode status
The March 22, 1949, episode exists, and can be viewed online at the Internet Archive.

See also
 List of programs broadcast by the DuMont Television Network
 List of surviving DuMont Television Network broadcasts

References

Bibliography
 David Weinstein, The Forgotten Network: DuMont and the Birth of American Television (Philadelphia: Temple University Press, 2004) 
 Alex McNeil, Total Television, Fourth edition (New York: Penguin Books, 1980) 
 Tim Brooks and Earle Marsh, The Complete Directory to Prime Time Network TV Shows, Third edition (New York: Ballantine Books, 1964)

External links
 
 DuMont historical website
 Episode of School House at the Internet Archive
 DuMont TV set ad from School House featuring Delmar and Cox

DuMont Television Network original programming
1949 American television series debuts
1949 American television series endings
1940s American variety television series
1940s American comedy television series
1940s American school television series
Black-and-white American television shows